Leonard Morris may refer to:
 Leonard Morris (sheriff)
 Leonard Morris (cricketer)